Mark Terence Graves (born 14 December 1960) is an English former professional footballer who played in the Football League, as a forward.

References

Sources
Profile at Neil Brown

1960 births
Living people
Footballers from Isleworth
English footballers
Association football forwards
Plymouth Argyle F.C. players
Wealdstone F.C. players
English Football League players